Congregation Berith Sholom ("Covenant of Peace") is a synagogue in Troy, New York. The synagogue is the oldest continuously used synagogue in the state of New York, the second oldest house of worship in the state outside of the city of New York, and one of the oldest synagogue buildings in the United States.

History
The congregation was formally founded in 1866 by members of two other congregations, and its name was originally spelled Baris Sholem. The building, which is still in use, was built in the summer of 1870, and finished in time for the High Holy Days. Reform ritual was adopted around 1890 and the congregation joined the Union of American Hebrew Congregations in 1920. Around 1953 an addition was built to house the religious school. The building is part of the Central Troy Historic District.

Other reading
A century of Temple Berith Sholom, Troy, New York, by Samuel Rezneck, Rickman Press (1966)

References

Reform synagogues in New York (state)
Buildings and structures in Troy, New York
1866 establishments in New York (state)
Synagogues completed in 1870